Line Horntveth (born 26 November 1974 in Tønsberg, Norway) is a Norwegian musician (tuba, flute percussion, and vocals), the sister of the musicians Martin and Lars Horntveth, married to the upright bassist Bjørn Holm, and known from a series of recordings within Jaga Jazzist.

Biography 

Horntveth got her Examen artium from the Tønsberg Gymnas in 1993. Her formal musical studies started at Toneheim Folkehøgskole and later she has attended studies at the University of Oslo.

Her latest project 'Budding Rose' released their debut album Where Were Ye All? (2013). This is a collaborative effort with the multi instrumentalist Terje Johanssen, known from collaborations with Lars Martin Myhre.

Discography 
Within Jaga Jazzist
1996: Jævla Jazzist Grete Stitz (Thug Records)
2001: A Livingroom Hush (Smalltown Supersound)
2002: The Stix (WEA International Inc.)
2003: Animal Chin (Gold Standard Laboratories)
2005: What We Must (Ninja Tune)
2010: One-Armed Bandit (Ninja Tune)
2013: Live with Britten Sinfonia (Ninja Tune)
2015: Starfire (Ninja Tune)

With Cato Salsa Experience
2000: A Good Tip for a Good Time (Garralda Records)

With Motorpsycho
2001: Phanerothyme (Columbia)

With The Lionheart Brothers
2007: Dizzy Kiss (Racing Junior)

With Marjit Vinjerui
2010: Friendly Fools (Vinjerui Records)

With Susanne Sundfør
2012: The Silicone Veil (EMI Music Norway)

With Flunk
2013: Lost Causes (Beatservice Records)

With Budding Rose
2013: Where Were Ye All? (Grappa Music)

References

External links 
 Ompa til du sulter interview in Dagbladet 2003 (in Norwegian)
 Jaga Jazzist – One-Armed Bandit (Live) on YouTube

Jaga Jazzist members
20th-century Norwegian tubists
21st-century Norwegian tubists
Norwegian jazz tubists
Women tubists
Avant-garde jazz musicians
Musicians from Tønsberg
1974 births
Living people
20th-century Norwegian women singers
20th-century Norwegian singers
21st-century Norwegian women singers
21st-century Norwegian singers